Hiroshima: Out of the Ashes is a 1990 American made-for-television historical war drama film about the Atomic bombing of Hiroshima. It was nominated for 2 Primetime Emmy Awards and other awards. Hiroshima: Out of the Ashes was directed by Peter Werner.

Synopsis
The story follows the bombing and aftermath of the Atomic bomb dropped on the city of Hiroshima, told from several different perspectives.

Cast
 Max von Sydow as Father Siemes
 Judd Nelson as Pete Dunham
 Mako as Sgt. Moritaki 
 Tamlyn Tomita as Sally
 Pat Morita as Yoodo Toda

Release

Hiroshima: Out of the Ashes was released on DVD on April 24, 2007.

References

External links
 

1990 television films
1990 films
American war drama films
1990s war drama films
Films about the atomic bombings of Hiroshima and Nagasaki
Films set in Japan
American films based on actual events
Films set in 1945
NBC network original films
Films directed by Peter Werner
Japan in non-Japanese culture
American drama television films
1990s American films